Gurara (Gourara) is a Zenati Berber language spoken in the Gourara (Tigurarin) region, an archipelago of oases surrounding the town of Timimoun in southwestern Algeria. Ethnologue gives it the generic name Taznatit ("Zenati"), along with Tuwat spoken to its south; however, Blench (2006) classifies Gurara as a dialect of Mzab–Wargla and Tuwat as a dialect of the Riff languages.

Characteristics
Gurara and Tuwat are the only Berber languages to change r in certain coda positions to a laryngeal ħ; in other contexts it drops r, turning a preceding schwa into a, and this latter phenomenon exists also in Zenata Rif-Berber in the far northern Morocco. 

There is inconclusive evidence for Songhay influence on Gurara.

Ahellil
The local tradition of ahellil poetry and music in Gurara, described in Mouloud Mammeri's L'Ahellil du Gourara, has been listed as part of the Intangible Cultural Heritage of Humanity by UNESCO.

References

Berber languages
Languages of Algeria